The discography of American singer-songwriter Kimberley Locke consists of five studio albums, one extended play, seventeen singles, and six music videos.

Following her top three finish on the second season of American Idol in 2003, Kimberley was signed to a recording deal with Curb Records.  Her debut album One Love was released on May 4, 2004 and entered the Billboard 200 chart at number sixteen. The album spawned four singles including the top-40 hit "8th World Wonder".

Locke's second album, titled Based on a True Story, was released on May 1, 2007. While first week sales did not match those of her first album, debuting at number 160 on the Billboard 200, it contained several successful singles.  Curb began including dance remix packages with each of the single releases, each hitting number one on the Billboard dance charts. All three went on to be included in the top 40 year-end dance charts  and the album's second single, a cover of the Freda Payne classic "Band of Gold" was featured at number 45 on Billboard's best dance songs of the decade list.

Later that same year, Locke released her holiday album Christmas on November 6, 2007.  This was her third and last album with Curb Records.  As with her previous releases, this album contained several successful singles.  The first and most successful single, "Up on the House Top," quickly reached number one on the Adult Contemporary chart, a spot it held for four weeks.  This was the fifth song in the history of the chart to reach number one in only three weeks on this chart and the first number one for the Curb label in eight years. The next two singles from the album, "Jingle Bells" and "Frosty the Snowman" also went number one on this chart.

In 2010, Locke teamed up with American Idol judge Randy Jackson and his new dance label, Dream Merchant 21, to release her first independent single, "Strobelight."  The following year she decided to form her own label, I AM Entertainment, and immediately started working on her next project. The dance-themed EP, Four for the Floor, was released on July 19, 2011. The only single, "Finally Free," which Locke had co-written with fellow American Idol alum Ace Young, was promoted the following summer accompanied by a music video and remix package and reached number 35 on the dance chart.

In 2013, she teamed up with UK production team Cahill for her latest single "Feel the Love," which she had co-written with long-time collaborator Damon Sharpe. The single scored her first international number one hit, topping both the UK club and pop charts and reaching number 29 on the global dance charts.

In 2021, she released two more studio albums.  Her first album of Children's music titled You're My Baby was released in May and her second album of Christmas music titled Christmas Is Here, on which she teamed up with Brooklyn-based band EMP3 was released in September.  The title track from the album, a cover of a Donna Summer original song from her 1994 album Christmas Spirit was released as the lead single.

Albums

Studio albums

Singles

Promotional singles

Extended plays

Music videos

Other appearances

References
Primary
 Kimberley Locke Discography at Discogs. Discogs. Retrieved February 12, 2014.
 Lockeography. KimberleyLockeOfficial.com.  Retrieved February 12, 2014.

Secondary

American Idol discographies
Pop music discographies
Discographies of American artists
Electronic music discographies
Rhythm and blues discographies